The diving competitions at the 2014 Commonwealth Games in Glasgow, Scotland took place between 30 July and 2 August at the Royal Commonwealth Pool in Edinburgh.  It was one of two aquatic sports at the Games, along with swimming.

The 2014 Games featured competitions in ten events (men and women events each of): 1m springboard, 3m springboard, synchronised 3m springboard, 10m platform, and synchronised 10m platform.

Schedule
All times are British Summer Time (UTC+1)

M = Morning session, E = Evening session

Medal summary

Medal table

Men

 Only four teams were registered to compete in the men's synchronised 10 metre platform event. As stipulated in the rules of the Games, this resulted in only the gold and silver medals being awarded.

Women

Participating nations
Nine nations competed in diving at the 2014 Commonwealth Games.

References

External links
Glasgow 2014
Official results book – Diving

 
2014
Diving
Commonwealth Games
2014 Commonwealth Games
Diving competitions in the United Kingdom